"The Invitations" is the 24th and final episode of the seventh season of Seinfeld and the 134th overall episode. It originally aired on May 16, 1996, and was the last episode written by co-creator Larry David before he left the writing staff at the end of this season (returning only to write the series finale in 1998). This episode was directed by Andy Ackerman.

As the season finale, "The Invitations" resolves the season 7 story arc of George's engagement to Susan. With the wedding day drawing near, George still does not want to marry Susan, and his friends collaborate with him in a last desperate bid to end the engagement. Meanwhile, Jerry becomes engaged as well when he falls in love with a woman who shares all his interests and personal quirks.

The black comedy of the engagement story arc's resolution was controversial. In 2005, TV Guide ranked the episode #8 as part of its "Top 100 Most Unexpected Moments in TV History".

Plot
George and Susan go shopping for wedding invitations and George insists on buying the cheapest brand in the store. They run into Kramer, who misremembers Susan's name, prompting Susan to decide he can no longer be an usher at the wedding. She also declines Elaine's demand to be an usher, not wanting any female ushers.

Kramer visits a bank which offers anyone $100 if they are not greeted with a "hello". Upon being greeted with "hey" instead of "hello", he demands $100. After consulting with the other employees, all of whom use various non-hello greetings, the manager compromises by giving Kramer $20.

Jerry absentmindedly walks in front of a car and is saved by a woman named Jeannie Steinman, who is just like him. He falls in love, and after dating for a while, proposes marriage to her. Almost immediately after her acceptance, Jerry no longer thinks Jeannie is his type, and regrets the proposal.

George admits that he does not want to marry Susan, but is unwilling to go through the fight which will ensue if he calls the wedding off. Angry at Susan for not allowing them to be ushers, Elaine suggests George smoke (since Susan hates smoking) and Kramer suggests he offend her by asking she sign a prenuptial agreement, both of which backfire because the smoking makes George sick and Susan unreservedly agrees to sign the prenuptial agreement.

Disregarding George's suggestion to use glue for the wedding invitations since the adhesive in the envelopes takes a lot of moisture to work, Susan keeps licking envelopes until she passes out. George returns to his apartment, finds that Susan has collapsed, and takes her to the hospital. After the examination, a doctor informs George that Susan is dead from licking the envelopes, since the adhesive is toxic. George, Jerry, and Elaine seem puzzled by their own lack of emotional response to her death. The tables have turned since Jerry is now unhappily engaged and George, with the death of Susan, is not.

George calls Marisa Tomei, tells her his fiancée has died, and asks her on a date. She hangs up on him.

Production
The episode's writer, Seinfeld co-creator Larry David, originally came up with George's plan to move to China for the season two episode "The Ex-Girlfriend". It was cut from that episode prior to broadcast, so he repurposed the material for "The Invitations".

Yankees owner George Steinbrenner, long portrayed on Seinfeld by the voice of Larry David, filmed scenes for a guest appearance in this episode, but footage for the episode ran well over its allotted 23 minutes, so his scenes were all cut for time. Other cuts made to fit the episode within its time slot include some sequences from the Jerry and Jeannie montage, Jerry and Jeannie's conversation after making out, and Jeannie joking that she's only marrying Jerry to get her green card.

The cast reading for the episode was on March 31, 1996. Filming commenced on April 1, and the majority of the scenes were filmed before a live studio audience on April 3.

This episode was temporarily pulled from syndication in the wake of the 2001 anthrax attacks in the United States in October. The episode returned to syndication in the summer of 2002.

This is the last episode to feature Larry David as executive producer. He returned to write the two-part finale, and voiced the character of George Steinbrenner for three episodes of Season 8.

On June 3, 2015, Jason Alexander said during an interview on The Howard Stern Show that Swedberg's character had been killed off due to incompatibility with the other stars' comedic rhythm on the show, and the decision was made to cut Swedberg after Jerry Seinfeld and Julia Louis-Dreyfus acted alongside her. The following day, Alexander apologized on Twitter for his comments, explaining that his words were ill-chosen and misconstrued, and that the decision to kill Susan had nothing to do with Swedberg. He added that Swedberg had more than once offered to adapt her acting to any suggestions he might have, and he had declined, and that while he always felt the rhythm between the two of them was off, show creators David and Seinfeld and the show's fans clearly felt the chemistry between them was just what it should be.

Reaction
The episode's ending received a very mixed public reaction, and generated many letters to publications such as TV Guide regarding the tastelessness of Susan's demise, and the characters' indifference.

Heidi Swedberg, who played Susan, has stated she had no problem with her character's death, explaining in an interview with Entertainment Weekly that "A lot of the show's humor is based on the fact that the main characters are not nice people. They admit to things the rest of us think about but don't like to admit." For months after the episode's broadcast, fans recognizing her on the street expressed frustration and resentment regarding her character's fate. Similarly, Jason Alexander claims that fans of George's character turned on him only once, and that was over Susan’s death.

Alexander later said, "On that set, funny was the ruler, and it was unquestionably funny. Wrong and rude and dangerous—but funny."

In December 2005, the episode was listed at number eight as part of the "Top 100 Most Unexpected Moments in TV History" by TV Guide and TV Land.

Trivia
Jerry sitting by the pier in contemplation mirrors the scene of George doing the same in "The Engagement."

Larry David later used the idea of the car periscope invention as the basis for an investment opportunity in the Curb Your Enthusiasm episode "Car Periscope".

Reference list

External links

Seinfeld (season 7) episodes
1996 American television episodes
Television episodes written by Larry David